Supernatural Fairy Tales is the only album by Art, who were formerly known as The V.I.P.'s. The album contains mostly band compositions plus a cover of The Young Rascals' "Come on Up" and Buffalo Springfield's "For What It's Worth".  Unusual for 1967, the album was issued in mono only.

Shortly after this album's release the band dissolved, with all four musicians of the final line-up forming the band Spooky Tooth later in 1967 with the American musician Gary Wright.

Track listing
Except where noted, all songs written by Luther Grosvenor, Mike Harrison, Mike Kellie and Greg Ridley.

Side one
"I Think I'm Going Weird" - 3:21
"What's That Sound (For What It's Worth)" - (Stephen Stills) - 2:41
"African Thing" - 4:06
"Room with a View" - 3:40
"Flying Anchors" - 2:43
"Supernatural Fairy Tale" - 3:36

Side two
"Love Is Real" - 3:19
"Come on Up" (Felix Cavaliere) - 3:01
"Brothers, Dads and Mothers" - 3:02
"Talkin' to Myself" - 1:41
"Alive Not Dead" - 2:14
"Rome Take Away Three" - 2:59

Bonus tracks
"Love is Real"
"I Think I'm Going Weird"
"Room With a View"
"Flying Anchors"
"Supernatural Fairy Tales"
"Talkin' to Myself"

Personnel
Art
Mike Harrison – vocals, piano
Luther Grosvenor – guitars, vocals
Greg Ridley – bass
Mike Kellie – drums
Technical
Chris Blackwell - production supervision
Hapshash and the Coloured Coat - sleeve design

References

Spooky Tooth albums
1967 debut albums
Albums produced by Guy Stevens
Albums produced by Chris Blackwell
Island Records albums